Gal may refer to:

People

Surname
 Gál, a Hungarian surname
 Andreas Gal (born 1976), German programmer
 Dani Gal (born 1975), Israeli video artist
 Dean Gal (born 1995), Israeli footballer
 Edward Gal (born 1970), Dutch dressage rider
 Gedalia Gal (born 1933), Israeli farmer and former politician
 Igor Gal (born 1983), Croatian footballer
 Jenny Gal (born 1969), Dutch-Italian judoka
 Lidia Gal, Israel chess master
 Naomi Gal (born 1944), Israeli writer
 Nora Gal (1912–1991), Soviet translator and literary critic
 Riki Gal (born 1950), Israeli singer
 Reuven Gal (born 1942), Israeli psychologist
 Sandra Gal (born 1985), German LPGA golfer
 Șandor Gal (born 1955), Romanian former ice hockey player
 Sharon Gal (born 1974), Israeli journalist and politician
 Shmuel Gal, Israeli mathematician and professor
 Susan Gal (born 1949), American academic
 Udi Gal (born 1979), Israeli Olympic sailor
 Uziel Gal (1923–2002), German-born Israeli gun designer
 Yehoshua Gal (born 1951), Israeli former footballer
 Yoram Gal (born 1952), Israeli playwright and actor
 Zehava Gal, Israeli operatic mezzo-soprano

Given name or nickname
 Gal I (Bishop of Clermont) (–), Christian saint
 Gal Alberman (born 1983), Israeli footballer
 Gal Arel (born 1989), Israeli footballer
 Gal Barel (born 1990), Israeli footballer
 Gal Cohen (born 1982), Israeli footballer
 Gal Costa (1945–2022), Brazilian pop singer
 Gal Fridman (born 1975), windsurfer and first Israeli to win an Olympic gold medal
 Gal Gadot (born 1985), Israeli actress and model
 Gal Genish (born 1991), Israeli footballer
 Gal Hirsch (born 1964), Israeli general
 Gal Koren (born 1992), Slovenian hockey player
 Gal Levy (born 1994), Israeli footballer; see 2016–17 Maccabi Petah Tikva F.C. season
 Gal Mayo (born 1981), Israeli footballer
 Gal Mekel (born 1988), Israeli National Basketball Association player
 Gal Mesika (born 1988), Israeli American football and association football player
 Gal Nevo (born 1987), Israeli swimmer
 Gal Nir (born 1983), Israeli football goalkeeper
 Gal Sapir (born 1990), Israeli footballer
 Gal Sone (born 1985), Japanese competitive eater
 Gal Shish (born 1989), Israeli footballer
 Gal Tzruya (born 1989), Israeli footballer; see List of Israeli football transfers summer 2020
 Gal Uchovsky (born 1958), Israeli screenwriter and producer
 Gal Weinstein (born 1970), Israeli artist
 Gal Yekutiel (born 1981), Israeli judoka
 Paul Gallen (born 1981), Australian rugby league footballer

Pseudonym or nom de guerre
 GAL (cartoonist) (born 1940), Belgian cartoonist
 János Gálicz or "General Gal", Austro-Hungarian brigade and division commander during the Spanish Civil War

Places
 County Galway, Ireland, Chapman code GAL
 Gal, Azerbaijan, a village and municipality in Nakhchivan
 Gal, Iran, a village in East Azerbaijan Province, Iran
 Gali (town), in Abkhazia
 Hal, Azerbaijan, a village in Qubadli

Politics and law 
 GAL (paramilitary group), a 1980s Spanish anti-ETA group
 Global administrative law
 Great Autonomies and Freedom, an Italian parliamentary group
 Guardian ad litem, a type of legal guardian in the United States
 Green-Alternative List, now Alliance 90/The Greens Hamburg, a German political party

Science 
 Gal (newspaper), a trilingual newspaper published in Abkhazia
 Gal (unit), a unit of acceleration
 Galactose, a sugar
 Galanin, a peptide encoded by the GAL gene
 Galeandra, an orchid genus
 Galectin, an enzyme
 Gallon, a unit of capacity or volume

Technology 
 .gal, a top-level Internet domain for Galicia, Spain
 Generic array logic
 Generalized Automation Language
 Global Address List in groupware

Language 
 Gal language
 Galoli language (ISO code)
 GAL (cuneiform), Sumerian cuneiform character

Other uses 
 Gal (1969 album), by Gal Costa
 GAL (film), a 2006 Spanish film
 Edward G. Pitka Sr. Airport, serving Galena, Alaska
 Epistle to the Galatians
 Gal-class submarine of the Israeli Navy
 General Aircraft Limited, a British aircraft manufacturer
 Global Aero Logistics, an American airline holding company
 , a Japanese fashion style for young women
 Kogal, a newer Japanese fashion style for young women, also sometimes referred to as "gal"
 Stadium Gal, a football stadium in Irun, Spain

See also

 Gals (disambiguation)
 Gally (disambiguation)
 Avigdor Ben-Gal (born 1936), Israeli former general
 Avner Ben-Gal (born 1966), Israeli painter and artist